Mpama can refer to:

 Mpama language, Bantu language of the Democratic Republic of the Congo
 Mpama people, ethnic group of the Congo and Democratic Republic of the Congo
 , tributary of the Alima in the Congo